An electric skateboard is a personal transporter based on a skateboard. The speed is usually controlled by a wireless hand-held throttle remote, or rider body weight-shifting between front of the board for forward motion and rear for braking. As for the direction of travel to the right or left, it is adjusted by tilting the board to one side or the other. The classification of electric skateboards (e.g. whether they qualify as a 'vehicle') and legality of their use on roads or pavements varies between countries.

History

Early incarnations
The MotoBoard, which was gasoline-powered, was released in the summer of 1975 but was banned in California in 1997 due to noise and pollution.

Modern electric devices

Louie Finkle of Seal Beach, California is often cited as an originator of the modern electric skateboard, offering his first wireless electric skateboard in 1997 and a patent filed in April 1999, however it was not until the 2004–2006 that electric motors and batteries were available with sufficient torque and efficiency to power boards effectively.

In 2012, ZBoard, raised nearly 30 times their target for a balance controlled electric skateboard on Kickstarter, which was well received at the Consumer Electronics Show in Las Vegas in January 2013. Their 2015 campaign on Indiegogo was 86 time over-subscribed, raising $1 million.

Types Of Electric Skateboards
There are two basic types of electric skateboards in the market.

 Longboard - It is best for travelers.
 Cruisers - It is best for cruising short distances.

Design and operation

It was originally designed for local transport, but now offer a more serious "Off Road" model as a new thrill sport. The Off Road style boards are able to traverse grass, gravel, dirt and hard sand with ease and are often seen at low tide on the beach.

The basic design of an electric skateboard consists of an electric motor (out-runner or hub), batteries, speed controller (often the specially designed VESC), and a wireless throttle on top of a regular skateboard, longboard or other variant (e.g. penny board, mountain board).

Motor 
Traction is typically provided by one or more of the following:

 Wheel hub motor – the motor is encased in a urethane or rubber 'sleeve' and acts as a wheel.
 Out-runner motors – the motor is mounted close to the wheel and linked with a toothed belt and pulleys. The pulley choice can be used to gear the drive system for desired torque and top speed.
 Direct drive motors - placed between the wheels and the trucks and connected directly to the wheels.

Board deck 
Electric skateboards are able to travel at high speeds, as well as go off-road. The stability, in turn, is determined by a couple of key deck features:

 Length – Achieving high speed almost always requires the use of a longboard. The longer the deck is, the more stable the skateboard will be.
 Wheelbase – The wheelbase is distance between the front truck and rear truck, with a wider wheelbase providing better weight distribution and stability at speed.
 Flexibility – Flexibility is the deck's ability to absorb shocks. Greater flexibility has a negative impact on the unit's stability, so downhill racers require stiffer decks.

Electronic Speed Controller
All electric skateboards need an electronic speed controller (ESC) in order to vary the speed of the motor for accelerating or braking. Originally, hobbyists would typically use ESCs from radio-controlled model cars, but the rise in popularity and interest in building electric skateboards created demand for bespoke and more sophisticated ESCs. The VESC (Variable Electronic Speed Controller) may include motor and battery protection, regenerative braking, programming options e.g. acceleration and deceleration curves, and other advanced features.

Truck 
Trucks are important and extremely durable parts that are mounted under the surface of the electric skateboard.

Trucks are part of a T-shaped metal body under the two ends of the skateboard.

When choosing trucks, user should choose an axis with the length of 2 closest to the width of the board. The slight difference in width between the skateboard axis and the skateboard surface will greatly affect the time skateboarding. To have a safe and accurate way to buy skateboards, you just need to pay attention "the bigger the surface of the board, the bigger the axis of the board."

Safety 
Typical retail boards such as those from Evolve and Boosted are able to reach top speeds of around 20-25mph (32-40kph) on their fastest modes, while specialist and hobbyist boards can be built with very powerful motors for top speeds of 50mph (80kph) and beyond. Braking is typically implemented as Dynamic braking / Regenerative braking from the rear wheels only and the stopping distance can vary widely between motors and wheels/tyres.

There have been several fatal accidents involving electric skateboards  and many accounts of hospital visits. Personal protective equipment including helmet, knee, elbow and wrist pads are recommended for high speed riding.

See also
 Personal transporter#Use and regulation by country
 Self-balancing scooter
 Skateboarding

References

Electric vehicles
Skateboards
Personal transporters